Trundeh Ki Kori is a town in the Islamabad Capital Territory of Pakistan. It is located at 33° 24' 45N 73° 17' 20E with an altitude of 519 metres (1706 feet).

References

Union councils of Islamabad Capital Territory